Railway electrification in Great Britain began in the late 19th century. A range of voltages has been used, employing both overhead lines and conductor rails. The two most common systems are  using overhead lines, and the  third rail system used in Southeast England and on Merseyrail. As of March 2020,  (38%) of the British rail network was electrified.

According to Network Rail, as at 2003, 64% of the electrified network used the 25kVAC overhead system, and 36% used the 660/750VDC third-rail system.

The electrified network is set to expand over coming years, as 25kV electrification is extended to currently unelectrified lines such as the Midland Main Line, as well as lines in the North of England as part of the Northern Hub.

History

Early electrification
The first electric railway in Great Britain was Volk's Electric Railway in Brighton, a pleasure railway, which opened in 1883, still functioning to this day. The London Underground began operating electric services using a fourth rail system in 1890 on the City and South London Railway, now part of the London Underground Northern line. The Liverpool Overhead Railway followed in 1893, being designed from the outset to be electric traction, unlike the City and South London Railway which was designed to be cable hauled initially.

Main line electrification of some suburban lines began in the early years of the 20th century, using a variety of different systems. The Mersey Railway converted to 600VDC electric multiple-unit operation on 3 May 1903, thus eliminating the problems caused by steam traction in the long tunnel under the River Mersey, and the Lancashire & Yorkshire Railway's Liverpool Exchange to Southport (and on to Crossens) suburban commuter line was similarly electrified at 625V by March 1904. Both of these lines initially used a fourth rail system.

In 1921, a government committee chose 1,500VDC overhead to be the national standard, but little implementation followed and many different systems co-existed. During the interwar period, the Southern Railway adopted the 660VDC third rail system as its standard and greatly expanded this system across its network of lines South of London.

Post-war
After World War II and the nationalisation of the railways in 1948, British Railways (BR) expanded electrification at both 1,500VDC overhead and 660/750 V third rail. In 1956, BR adopted 25 kV AC overhead as standard for all projects outside logical extensions of third-rail systems.

Twenty-first century
The 25kVAC network has continued to expand slowly, and large areas of the country outside London are not electrified. In 2007, the government's preferred option was to use diesel trains running on biodiesel, its White Paper Delivering a Sustainable Railway, ruling out large-scale railway electrification for the following five years.

In May 2009, Network Rail launched a consultation on large-scale electrification, potentially to include the Great Western Main Line and Midland Main Line and smaller "in-fill" schemes. Key benefits cited were that electric trains are faster, more reliable and cause less track wear than diesel trains. On 5 June 2009, Lord Adonis was appointed Secretary of State for Transport, and announced the plans to electrify the Great Western Main Line from London as far as Swansea, as well as infill electrification schemes in the North West of England.

In Scotland, where transport is devolved to the Scottish Government, Transport Scotland has extended and continues to expand electrification, for example, on the Airdrie–Bathgate rail link. This is part of a larger plan that has seen many major routes in central Scotland electrified, including the main – route. They have pursued electrification with multiple schemes in the Central Belt. All these have been 25kVAC, as in England and Wales.

In July 2012 the UK government announced £4.2billion of new electrification schemes, all at 25kVAC and reconfirmed schemes previously announced by Adonis. These were to be Northern Hub, Great Western Main Line, South Wales Main Line, Midland Main Line, Electric Spine, Crossrail, Gospel Oak to Barking line and West Midlands suburban lines including the Cross-City Line.

On 25 June 2015 the government announced that some of the electrification projects would be delayed or cut back because of rising costs. Electrification work was to be "paused" on the Trans-Pennine route between York and Manchester and on the Midland main line between Bedford and Sheffield. Electrification of the Great Western main line would go ahead but the status of the Reading–Newbury and Didcot–Oxford sections was unclear.

However, in September 2015, the electrification work was "un-paused", but with a delayed completion date. Since then there have been regular updates including one published in October 2016.

On 20 July 2017 Chris Grayling the Secretary of State for Transport cancelled a number of electrification projects citing disruptive works and use of bi-mode technology as an alternative.

Electrification has not been without controversy with cancellations and various appearances of the Secretary of State for Transport called before the Transport Select Committee. The Transport Select Committee published its report into various matters including regional investment disparity on the railways and calling again for the reinstatement of various cancelled electrification schemes.

A written question was submitted and answered in parliament regarding route miles electrified in the years 1997–2019.

In March 2019 the Railway Industry Association published a paper on Electrification cost challenge suggesting ways forward and a rolling program of electrification.

Future of third rail

In June 2011 Peter Dearman of Network Rail suggested that the third-rail network will need to be converted into overhead lines. Agreeing that conversion would be expensive, he said that the third rail network is at the limit of its power capability, especially as trains become more advanced in technology. This conversion would be a pilot scheme to develop a business case for full conversion of the third-rail network. The Office of Rail and Road (ORR) has also stated that, on safety grounds, third-rail 750VDC has a limited future.

Existing systems – overhead line (OHL)

National Rail: 25 kV, 50 Hz AC overhead
British Railways chose this as the national standard for future electrification projects outside of the third rail area in 1956. Following this, a number of lines that were originally electrified at a different voltage were converted, and a number of lines have been newly electrified with this system. Work started in the late 1950s. The first major electrification project using 25 kV was the West Coast Main Line (1959–1974). Initially this was Crewe, Manchester and Liverpool south into London and Birmingham. Weaver Junction north to Glasgow followed later. The 25 kV network has been gradually expanded ever since:

Existing 
Great Western Main Line 

West Coast Main Line
: see Northampton loop.
: see Rugby–Birmingham–Stafford line.
 to Manchester Piccadilly: see Stafford–Manchester line and Crewe–Manchester line.
The "Abbey Flyer" (Abbey Line) was electrified in 1987–88 by Network SouthEast.
 in 1989 (from Carstairs Junction in conjunction with East Coast Main Line electrification)
In 2003, the Crewe– section of the Crewe–Derby line was electrified as a diversionary route for the WCML.
Since 1999, the line has been modernised and the overhead line equipment has been refurbished and renewed from Mark 1 / Mark 3A to UK1 range to allow an increase line speeds from 110mph to 125mph (with 140mph capability in areas previously fitted with Automatically Tensioned Mark 1 equipment - subject to upgrading of the balance weight arrangement to provide individually tensioned contact / catenary wires and regrading of the contact wires). At the same time sections of the line are being progressively changed to autotransformer system.

Midland Main Line
In November 2021, the Integrated Rail Plan (IRP) was published. This included full Midland Main Line electrification. On 21 December 2021 it was announced that work would start immediately on electrification of the section between Kettering and Market Harborough. Grant Shapps claimed this work was proof the IRP was being implemented quickly but was met with ridicule.

High Speed 1
 Newest main line, completed in 2007.

East Coast Main Line
Electrified in two parts: 1975–78, and 1984–91
This included the Hertford loop line.
By 1990, electrification had reached , and in 1991 Edinburgh Waverley. The Mark 3B range was used throughout the electrification scheme, certain areas are presently being upgraded to the Mark 3D design range, this will eliminate known corrosion issues with the AWAC catenary and replace solid stainless steel droppers with flexible copper current carrying designs. Some headspan to portal conversions are also taking place.

West Anglia / Fen Line
The Lea Valley line between Coppermill Junction and Cheshunt was electrified at 25kV in 1969. All the 6.25kV areas were converted to 25kV in 1983. In 1987, electrification was extended from Bishop's Stortford to Cambridge at 25kV. In 1990 the line to  opened, and in 1992 electrification was extended from Cambridge to  along the Fen Line.

Great Eastern Main Line
London Liverpool Street to Norwich.
Converted from 1,500 V DC (see 1,500 V DC section "Shenfield Metro")
Converted from 6.25 kV/1,500 V DC to a combination of AT and FT 25 kV Mark GE (Great Eastern) between 1976 and 1980. Presently being upgraded to the GEFF (Great Eastern Furrer + Frey) range altering the catenary from a compound to simple sagged arrangement.
Romford–Upminster line
Shenfield–Southend line
Crouch Valley line
Braintree branch line
Mayflower line
Sunshine Coast Line

London, Tilbury and Southend line
The majority was originally electrified at 6.25 kV, final sections converted to 25 kV in March 1989.

London Overground
Local lines within London electrified with 25 kV are:
Lea Valley lines
Gospel Oak to Barking line
Various other suburban lines in the north of the city are electrified as part of other routes mentioned above.

West Midlands
West Coast Main Line routes electrified in the 1960s:
Trent Valley line
Stone to Colwich Line
Rugby–Birmingham–Stafford line
Stafford–Manchester line
Walsall–Wolverhampton line
Commuter lines out of :
Cross-City Line: electrified 1993
Chase Line: New Street to  completed 2017

Manchester and North West area
Manchester to Glossop / Hadfield (converted from the truncated 1500 V DC Manchester-Sheffield-Wath electric railway)
Manchester to Liverpool via Earlestown line: electrified in 2015 as part of the Northern Hub project.
Manchester, South Junction and Altrincham Railway (part was converted to Manchester Metrolink)
Styal Line: including branch to 
Manchester–Preston line: via Bolton and  completed 2019
Preston to Blackpool North: completed 2018
Stafford–Manchester line: branch of the WCML, electrified in the wake of the BR 1955 Modernisation Plan
Crewe–Manchester line: branch of the WCML, electrified in the wake of the 1955 Modernisation Plan

Leeds area
In 1994, a project to electrify some of the local lines around Leeds was given authority to proceed. The project was called the "Leeds North West Electrification", which electrified:
Airedale line to Skipton and 
Wharfedale line to Ilkley
Wakefield line electrified in 1989 as part of the East Coast Main Line electrification to London King's Cross
 In 2020 the electrification of the first part of the stalled TransPennine project, from Leeds to Dewsbury and Huddersfield, was approved and work also commenced on the York to Church Fenton section of the York to Leeds line.

Edinburgh
In 1991, the ECML to Edinburgh was electrified. A few local routes were also electrified.
The service is by DMUs, pending reopening of part of the Waverley Route.
North Berwick Line: Edinburgh Waverley to 
Intercity trains from the ECML continue to Glasgow Central.

Central Scotland
It opened on 11 December 2010. The electrification of the main inter-city route between Edinburgh and Glasgow Queen Street High Level via Falkirk was completed in 2017. The project, known as the Edinburgh to Glasgow Improvement Programme, entailed infill electrification in the Glasgow area and Greenhill Junction to Stirling, Dunblane and Alloa, which mainly carry commuter services. Electric services on these lines commenced in December 2018.

Glasgow Suburban
Suburban electrification was begun during the 1960s in the wake of the BR 1955 Modernisation Plan. Electrification was piecemeal and is still incomplete, with a few commuter lines still unelectrified such as the East Kilbride branch and Glasgow to Anniesland via Maryhill, and the mainline from Glasgow to Carlisle via Kilmarknock and Dumfries. 

The Glasgow Suburban railway network can be divided into three main areas:
South Clyde: the Cathcart Circle Line (Glasgow Central to Newton and ) was electrified on 22 May 1962.
On the Glasgow–Edinburgh via Carstairs line, some North Berwick Line trains continue to Glasgow Central. A single daily East Coast intercity train from the ECML continues to and from Glasgow Central. The line between Springburn and Glasgow Queen Street (High Level) has not yet been completed. Until Glasgow Queen Street High Level has been electrified, electric Cumbernauld Line trains reverse at Springburn and run through Glasgow Queen Street Low Level station.

2010s Network Rail electrification programme

In 2009, Lord Adonis was appointed Secretary of State for Transport. In July 2012, the UK government announced £4.2billion of new electrification schemes, all at 25kVAC and reconfirmed schemes previously announced by Adonis. These were to be Northern Hub, Great Western Main Line, South Wales Main Line, Midland Main Line, Electric Spine, Crossrail, Gospel Oak to Barking line and West Midlands suburban lines. Rail transport in Scotland is a devolved matter for the Scottish Government but they too have pursued electrification with multiple schemes in the Central Belt. All these have been 25kVAC also as in England and Wales. Electrification has not been without controversy with cancellations and various appearances of the Secretary of State for Transport called before the Transport Select Committee. The number of route miles electrified in these years was answered to a written question in parliament.

In November 2019 the annual statistics for route miles electrified was published by the DfT and shows that 38% of the UK network is now electrified.

The projects have been subject to cost overruns and delays, and on 8 November 2016 the government announced that several elements of the Great Western Main Line electrification programme would be indefinitely deferred. In an attempt to mitigate and improve the cost situation the Railway Industry Association published a report in March 2019 detailing why costs had risen and suggested ways forward.

However, in the new parliament after the 2019 General election, the Transport Select Committee chaired by Huw Merriman has met on a number of occasions and continued the "Trains fit for the future" enquiry theme started by the previous committee. On 23 March 2021, after many witnesses were called and written and oral evidence considered, a report was released calling for an immediate resumption of electrification in a rolling programme. However, in December 2021 in a story that appeared in the Telegraph it was stated that the Treasury had declined to support the electrification programme. Reputable peer reviewed journals state that electrification is the most relevant technology for reducing transports effect on the environment.

Other systems

1,500 V DC, overhead
 Tyne and Wear Metro: The Tyne & Wear Metro, which opened in 1980, is now the only system left in the UK using the 1500VDC overhead lines. Although it is often described as "light rail", it is closer to a heavy metro, using only segregated track. Much of its route follows that of the previous Tyneside Electrics, which had been converted to diesel by 1967. Since 2002, the Metro has shared main-line track on the Durham Coast Line to Sunderland. This presents a potential problem for main-line services if routes into Sunderland or Newcastle upon Tyne that use this section were to be electrified at 25kVAC.

Historically, there were more lines electrified at 1,500 V DC, but these have all since been either converted to 25kVAC or closed. (see 1,500VDC, overhead (historic))

750 V DC, overhead

Used on several tram systems:
 Edinburgh Trams
 Manchester Metrolink
 Sheffield Supertram
 Croydon Tramlink
 Nottingham Express Transit
 West Midlands Metro

Other overhead systems
 Blackpool Tramway: originally 550VDC, in 2011 upgraded to 600 V to operate more modern rolling stock.
 The National Tramway Museum at Crich, Derbyshire uses 600 V DC. This voltage was chosen for maximum compatibility with its historic fleet of trams as well as more modern units.
 The Wirral Tramway uses 550VDC.
 The Seaton Tramway uses 120VDC.

Existing systems - third and fourth rails

National Rail: 650 V - 750 V DC, third rail (top contact)

Southern Electric
The extensive southern third rail electric network covers South London and the southern counties of Dorset, Hampshire, Sussex, Surrey and Kent.

The London and South Western Railway (L&SWR) third-rail system at 660VDC began before World War I from London Waterloo to suburban destinations. The Southern Railway was formed in the 1923 grouping; it adopted the L&SWR system, and by 1929 the London, Brighton and South Coast Railway (LB&SCR) suburban overhead network was replaced by third rail. The South Eastern Main Line was electrified at 600V, later upgraded to 750VDC. The third rail extended throughout most South London lines out of all its London termini. Throughout the 1930s, there was much main line electrification, including the Brighton Main Line (including East, West Coastways and related routes in 1932–1933), the Portsmouth Direct line (4 July 1937) and to Maidstone and Gillingham (1939).

After World War II, electrification was soon resumed in the newly nationalised British Railways' Southern Region. The BR 1955 Modernisation Plan included the two-stage "Kent Coast Electrification". The Chatham Main Line was completed, followed by the South Eastern Main Line and related lines. The voltage was raised from 660V to 750V. Since then, all electrification has used 750V; lines electrified before then remain at 660V. Attention then switched to the neglected former L&SWR area (then the South Western Division).

During sectorisation in the 1980s, Network SouthEast conducted extensive infill electrification. The Snow Hill tunnel was reopened, enabling Thameslink. The Hastings Line, Eastleigh–Fareham line and the Oxted line (East Grinstead branch) were electrified. This left only a few lines unelectrified: the West of England line, the Wessex Main Line, the North Downs Line, the Oxted line (Uckfield branch), the Marshlink line and the Eastleigh–Romsey line.

Merseyrail
Two lines of the Merseyrail network; the Northern line and the Wirral line use 750V DC third rail (see Suburban electrification of the London, Midland and Scottish Railway for its history).

Island Line (Isle of Wight)
The single remaining national rail line on the Isle of Wight, from Ryde Pierhead to Shanklin (with the Wroxall to Ventnor section closed),  was electrified in 1967, so that former London Underground rolling stock could be used, due to the limited height of Ryde Tunnel. The Island Line used 660VDC third rail, as it was a cheaper option to convert the LUL stock into third rail, and implement third rail only on the line. The rolling stock currently used is British Rail Class 484s (D-Train). The line was upgraded to a 750VDC third rail system in 2021 to allow Class 484 units to be used.

London Overground
Richmond to Stratford (North London line). 750VDC third rail from Richmond to Acton Central.
West London line. 750VDC from near the location of the former St. Quintin Park & Wormwood Scrubs railway station to Clapham Junction (shared with Southern services).
East London line. Highbury & Islington to New Cross station and the junctions with the South London network near New Cross Gate station and Queens Road Peckham station. Formerly, the East London Line was a much shorter London Underground line with fourth rail 630VDC between Shoreditch (closed 2006) and New Cross/New Cross Gate.

See Suburban electrification of the London, Midland and Scottish Railway for Euston–Watford DC Line history.

In 1970, the North London DC lines and the Class 501 EMUs used on these services were converted for third-rail operation, with the fourth rail generally being removed on sections not used by London Underground (LUL). Some fourth rail was retained in the Gunnersbury and Queens Park areas for emergency use by LUL. With the closure of Broad Street, the North London line was joined with the Stratford to North Woolwich line; this was electrified with third rail and overhead line as far as Stratford, third rail to North Woolwich.

As a compromise, the nominal line voltage is 650V, and since 1970 the centre rail has been bonded to the return running rail. There are no special provisions required at Queens Park, where the two dissimilar systems meet, just a gap longer than one coach of a Bakerloo line train at the entry to (and exit from) the Bakerloo, which operates with a nominal -210V on the fourth rail and +420V on the third rail. There is no bridging of the incompatible systems as trains pass from one to the other since, like all UK electric trains intended to run extensively in tunnels, there is no continuity of traction power circuits between vehicles of the train.

A similar arrangement applies between Putney Bridge and Wimbledon, where the District line runs over tracks owned by Network Rail, which is also used by South Western Railway, though normally only for stock movements.

Northern City Line

The Northern City Line connects the East Coast Main Line to Moorgate. It was isolated by the abandonment of the 1930s New Works Programme (and the development of the Metropolitan Green Belt). Tube services were truncated at its northern end by the Victoria line in 1964 at Drayton Park. The remainder was handed over to British Rail in 1975 in conjunction with the suburban electrification of the East Coast Main Line. The line uses third-rail DC electrification between Moorgate and Drayton Park, where trains switch to 25 kV AC overhead.

630 V DC, fourth rail (top contact)

London Underground
The London Underground is a large metro system operating across Greater London and beyond, commonly known as "the Tube". Its  is made up of 11 lines; electrification began during the 1890s. It was largely unified between 1900 and 1910 and nationalised in 1933, becoming the railway component of London Transport (LT). A major expansion programme (the "New Works") was launched, in which LT took over several urban branches of mainline railways.

The Underground is mostly in North London; its expansion into south London was limited by geology unfavourable to tunnelling and by the extensive main-line network, much of which was being electrified (see "Southern Electric").
The Underground uses a relatively uncommon four rail system of electrification. Two standard gauge rails are the running rails; the outer third rail carries positive current at +420VDC and the inner fourth rail is the negative return at –210VDC, giving a supply voltage of 630VDC. The chief advantage of the fourth-rail system is that, in tunnels with a metallic (usually cast-iron) lining, the return traction current does not leak into the lining causing electrolytic corrosion there or in adjacent utility mains. It also means that the two running rails are available exclusively for track circuits.

The surface sections use the fourth rail solely for operational consistency: the system shares track with Network Rail in several places. Where the track is shared with 750 V third-rail stock, the central rail is bonded to the running rails and the outside rail electrified at 660 V. This allows both types of train to operate satisfactorily. The suburban network of the London & North Western Railway (LNWR) was electrified in co-operation with the Underground, but during the 1970s British Rail introduced third-rail EMUs and the sections of the LNWR suburban network not used by the Underground had the fourth rail removed (see "London and North Western Railway", above).

The Underground has carried out studies to consider raising the voltage above the present 630V nominal. New equipment at their substations does allow for a future increase to a standard 750V nominal. In addition, the electrical equipment of new trains are also based on the use of 750V rated equipment. So, whilst new equipment is being designed to for 750V operation, no decision to increase the voltage has yet been made public by the Underground.

750 V DC, third rail (bottom contact)
Docklands Light Railway
This uses bottom-contact composite third rail, with an aluminium body and a steel contact surface. The advantage of this is a low-resistance, high-current-capacity rail with a durable steel surface for current collection. The rail may be surrounded by insulating material on the top and sides to reduce the risk of electrocution to railway staff and trespassers. The bottom-contact system is less prone to derangement by snow than top contact.

750 V DC, fourth rail (top contact)
Waterloo and City line
This system is unique to this line of London Underground operated railways. The use of 750 volts came about because the line was originally owned by Railtrack and operated by Network South East. It was upgraded in 1992/3 for both traction supply and rolling stock. Railtrack upgraded the original three rail system to four rail to solve problems with electrolytic damage to the iron tunnel linings (the reason four rail operation was adopted for all other tube lines). They also changed the voltage to 750 volts which had been adopted as their standard DC operating voltage some years earlier. The line was subsequently sold to London Underground in 1994 who inherited the non standard system (for London Underground). The line is still powered from its own substation located in the Waterloo depot.

600 V DC, third rail (top contact)
 Glasgow Subway, electrified in 1935

250 V DC, third rail (top contact)
 Hythe Pier Railway, electrified in 1922

110 V DC, third rail (top contact)
Volk's Electric Railway was originally electrified at 50VDC, raised to 160V in 1884 and reduced to 110VDC during the 1980s.

100 V DC, four rail
The elevated "monorail" at the National Motor Museum, Beaulieu uses rubber tyres running on two metal tracks, one on either side of the central guide. Because it is rubber-tyred, it requires two current conductors and two collectors (hence the four-rail designation).

Obsolete systems
Great Britain has used different electrification systems in the past. Many of these date from the early part of the 20th century, when traction electricity was in the experimental stage. This section describes each system, in order of decreasing voltage.

6,600V, 25Hz AC, overhead
Lancaster to Heysham via Morecambe: Used for an early trial of electrification; opened between 13 April and 14 September 1908. In 1953, it was converted to 50Hz, and operated until 1966.
'Elevated Electric' London suburban lines of the London, Brighton and South Coast Railway (LBSCR): The first large-scale suburban electrification scheme; starting with the South London Line and then extended to other commuter lines around the south of London, operational from 1 December 1909. Following the grouping into the LBSCR into the Southern Railway in 1922, all of the 6,600V lines were converted to the 650VDC third rail system by September 1929.

6,250V 50 Hz AC, overhead
During the initial electrification of parts of the network to 25kV50HzAC overhead, the initial solution to the limited clearance problems in suburban areas (due to numerous tunnels and bridges) in London and Glasgow was to use the lower voltage of 6.25kV. Later technological improvements in insulation allowed these areas to be converted to 25kV. The last sections of 6.25kV were converted during the 1980s.

London, Tilbury and Southend Lines
The 6.25kV section was from Fenchurch Street to beyond Barking, with changeovers there on both the Upminster and Tilbury lines. The remainder was at 25kV. The sections electrified at 6.25kV were converted to 25kV during the early 1980s.

Great Eastern Lines
The line from Liverpool Street to Southend Victoria was originally electrified at 1,500VDC overhead during the 1940s-50s. During the early 1960s, the whole of this line was converted to 6.25kVAC overhead, while the main line east of Shenfield was progressively electrified at 25kV, with changeover east of Shenfield. During the early 1980s, the line was again converted, this time to 25kV.

The Cambridge line and branches from Liverpool Street was electrified in the early 1960s, with 6.25kV out to a changeover at Cheshunt, and 25kV beyond. The Chingford and Enfield lines were thus at 6.25kV throughout. This route was again fully converted to 25kV in the early 1980s.

As part of the electrification onwards to Cambridge and Norwich in the 1980s, electric locomotives were transferred to these routes from the West Coast route. These locomotives would not have been able to operate at 6.25kV.

Glasgow Suburban network

On the North Clyde, the central section between Parkhead and before Dalmuir (Clydebank loop) and Westerton (Anniesland loop) were at 6.25kV, with the outer sections at 25kV. The Bridgeton and Springburn branches were thus at 6.25 kV throughout. The sections electrified at 6.25kV were converted to 25kV during the early 1980s.

On the South Clyde, the route from Glasgow Central around the Cathcart Loop was initially at 6.25kV, with changeovers to 25kV at Kings Park and Muirend on the Motherwell and Neilston routes. These lines were progressively converted to 25kV in the 1970s-80s.

3,500 V DC, overhead
Bury to Holcombe Brook
This was electrified by the Lancashire and Yorkshire Railway in 1913 as part of a trial system for export. The system was converted to third rail in 1918 (see below).

1,500 V DC, overhead (historic)
After World War I, the UK Government set up a committee to investigate the various systems of railway electrification; in 1921, it recommended that 1,500VDC overhead should be the future national standard. Several schemes were implemented in its wake, but the Great Depression and World War II meant that very little work was done. Technological advances after 1945 meant that the 25kVAC system was adopted instead for the West Coast Main line and Glasgow suburban electrification (as set out in the BR 1955 Modernisation Plan). However, at the same time, large amounts of money had been (and were still being) spent converting several lines to 1,500VDC.

Manchester, South Junction and Altrincham Railway
A joint LMS and LNER scheme, it opened on 11 May 1931. The success of this scheme influenced LNER's later electrification schemes. The line was converted to 25kVAC in 1971, but the stretch between Altrincham and Trafford Bar (plus the stretch between Trafford Bar and the Cornbrook viaduct) were later incorporated into Manchester Metrolink and converted again (this time to 750VDC).

Manchester–Sheffield–Wath
Known as the Woodhead Route, the LNER chose this hilly (and busy) main line for its first mainline electrification, with work beginning in 1936. Due to the Depression and World War II, it was not completed until the 1950s. After completion, the government chose to standardise on 25kVAC instead, leaving the Woodhead Route and the few other 1,500VDC lines isolated and non-standard. The passenger locomotives were sold in 1969 and saw further service in the Netherlands. In a subsequent rationalisation, BR closed much of this route east of Hadfield in 1981 in favour of the more southerly Hope Valley line, which serves more local communities. A section of the line between Manchester, Glossop and Hadfield remained open as part of the Manchester suburban network, and was operated by Class 506 EMU's, until it was converted to 25kVAC in December 1984.

Shenfield Metro
Civil engineering works began during the 1930s, but World War II intervened. It was converted on 4–6 November 1960, in the wake of the BR 1955 Modernisation Plan, to the new standard of 25kVAC (initially with some sections at 6.25kV). The rest of the GEML was subsequently electrified.

Shildon to Newport
This line ran from Shildon (County Durham) to Newport (near Middlesbrough). The route was initially over the 1825 Stockton-to-Darlington line, then via Simpasture Junction (the former Clarence railway) through Carlton, Carlton Junction to Carlton South Junction, Bowesfield West Junction to Bowesfield Junction, through Thornaby and ending at Erimus Yard (Newport East). In the wake of the electrification of Tyneside by the NER, this coal-carrying line was electrified between 1 July 1915 and 1 January 1916 as a planned precursor to electrifying NER's busy York to Newcastle main line (part of the East Coast Main Line). The LNER removed this electrification system in 1935 (between 7 January and 8 July); the decline in the coal market making it economically unfeasible to undertake the significant renewals required to continue electric operation. The locomotives were stored for other electrified routes.

1,200 V DC, third rail (side-contact)

Manchester Victoria - Bury
In 1916, the line between Manchester Victoria and Bury was electrified using 1,200 V DC third rail (side contact). The line between Bury and Holcombe Brook which had been electrified using 3,500V DC overhead in 1913 was converted to this system in 1918. It was abandoned in 1991, when the line was converted to a 750V DC system and became part of the Manchester Metrolink.

650 V DC, overhead
Swansea and Mumbles Railway

600 V DC, third rail
Tyneside Electrics
This was electrified in 1904, in response to extensive competition from new electric trams. The concept was a success for the North Eastern Railway (NER), a noted pioneer in electrification, as passenger numbers returned to pre-tram levels. As the stock reached life expectancy in 1937, the network was remodelled by London and North Eastern Railway (LNER) to reflect the changing industrial and residential makeup of the area. Electrified, at the same time, was the dockside branch, where a pair of Class ES1 (formerly NER No.1 and 2) locomotives were introduced in 1905. These British Thomson-Houston locomotives operated from both the third rail and overhead line. British Rail removed the electrification between 1963 and 1967, citing the changing industrial and population makeup of the area which reduced the need for electric traction. Much of the Tyneside network was later re-electrified, (using 1500VDC overhead), as the Tyne and Wear Metro.

525 V DC, third rail

Liverpool Overhead Railway
The Liverpool Overhead Railway was one of the earliest electric railways in Great Britain. The first section, between Alexandra Dock and Herculaneum Dock, was opened in 1893. The line connected with Lancashire and Yorkshire Railway's North Mersey Branch. It was never nationalised, and closed on 30 December 1956 due to extensive corrosion throughout its iron infrastructure (which was deemed uneconomical to replace).

500 V DC, overhead
Grimsby and Immingham Electric Railway

500 V DC, third rail
City and South London Railway
The City and South London Railway electrification was unusual (compared with later schemes) in that it used a three-wire DC system. This meant that, although the offset centre third rail was electrified at +500volts in the northbound tunnel, it was electrified at -500volts in the southbound tunnel. The motors on the locomotives and the incandescent electric lamps in the carriages worked, regardless of the polarity of the supply.
The three-wire system was adopted because the initial system was fed directly from the dynamos in the surface power plant at the Stockwell end of the line. It was important to minimise the voltage drop as much as possible, bearing in mind the rather steep gradient on the approach to King William Street Station.

440 V DC, third rail
London Post Office Railway
Underground railway under London operated by the Post Office. Operated between 1927 and closure in 2003. Partially re-opened as a tourist attraction in 2017.

See also

 British electric multiple units
 Campaign to Electrify Britain's Railways
 History of rail transport in Great Britain
 List of British electric locomotives

References

Further reading

525 V DC, third rail

630 V DC, fourth rail

650 V DC, third rail

750 V DC, third rail

1,500 V DC, overhead

6.6 kV 25 Hz AC, overhead

25 kV 50 Hz AC, overhead

External links
 Citytransport.info's Electrification advocacy page

Rail infrastructure in the United Kingdom
Great Britain
Train-related introductions in 1883